Renê Belmonte (born January 27, 1971, in São Paulo) is a Brazilian TV and movie screenwriter.

Belmonte studied advertising at ESPM in São Paulo then studied moviewriting in London at City Lit. After moving to Rio de Janeiro in 2001 he worked at Total Entertainment for three years, evaluating and developing projects in-house. Since 1999 he has been giving screenwriting courses and workshops for different schools and entities. In television he was segment producer and headwriter for the reality show Temptation Island Brazil (for SBT) and staff writer of the comedy show Sob Nova Direção (TV Globo). In 2006 he was the creator and headwriter of the sitcom Avassaladoras for Fox Television and Record.

For the big screen he wrote Sexo, amor e traição (2004), directed by Jorge Fernando, and Se eu fosse você (2006), directed by Daniel Filho, two of the biggest hits in the recent Brazilian filmography. His latest works include the German film Showdebola, directed by Alexander Pickl, and Sexo com Amor, directed by Wolf Maya, with a 2008 summer release date. He also wrote the script of Entre Sábanas, a Colombian film by Gustavo Nieto Roa currently filming in Bogotá.

Film credits
 Sexo, amor e traição (2004)
 Showdebola (2005)
 Se eu fosse você (2006)
 Sexo com Amor (2008)
 Entre Sábanas (in production)

External links
 

Brazilian screenwriters
Living people
1971 births